The 1969 Soviet Cup was an association football cup competition of the Soviet Union. The winner of the competition, Karpaty Lviv qualified for the continental tournament.

Competition schedule

First round
 [Mar 23] 
 ALGA Frunze                  w/o  Lokomotiv Tbilisi 
 AVTOMOBILIST Zhitomir        2-0  SKA Lviv 
 Dinamo Batumi                0-1  SPARTAK Brest 
   [Y.Shkola 75] 
 DINAMO Khmelnitskiy          3-2  Desna Chernigov 
 DINAMO Leningrad             1-0  Avtomobilist Nalchik 
 Dinamo Makhachkala           1-2  ROSTSELMASH Rostov-na-Donu 
 DINAMO Stavropol             1-0  Metallurg Lipetsk 
 ENERGETIK Dushanbe           2-0  Neman Grodno 
   [V.Makarov 57, G.Petrenko 90] 
 IRTYSH Omsk                  2-1  Lokomotiv Chelyabinsk 
 Kuban Krasnodar              0-1  TRUD Voronezh                [aet] 
 Lokomotiv Kherson            0-1  SKA Kiev 
 LUCH Vladivostok             1-0  SKA Khabarovsk 
 PAMIR Leninabad              2-1  Zarafshan Navoi 
 Polad Sumgait                0-0  Vostok Ust-Kamenogorsk 
 RASSVET Krasnoyarsk          2-1  Aeroflot Irkutsk             [aet] 
 RUBIN Kazan                  2-0  Zenit Izhevsk 
 Shakhtyor Kadiyevka          0-1  AZOVETS Zhdanov 
 SHAKHTYOR Karaganda          w/o  Metallurg Chimkent 
 SHIRAK Leninakan             w/o  Meshakhte Tkibuli 
 SKA Chita                    1-1  Selenga Ulan-Ude 
 SOKOL Saratov                1-0  Volgar Astrakhan 
   [Moiseyev] 
 SPARTAK Orjonikidze          2-1  Metallurg Tula 
 STROITEL Ashkhabad           1-0  Neftyanik Fergana 
 Stroitel Ufa                 0-0  Zvezda Perm 
 TEMP Barnaul                 w/o  Kalininets Sverdlovsk 
 TEXTILSHCHIK Ivanovo         1-0  Volga Gorkiy                 [aet] 
   [A.Piskaryov 117] 
 TOMLES Tomsk                 2-0  Kuzbass Kemerovo 
 Traktor Volgograd            1-2  SPARTAK Yoshkar-Ola 
 VOLGA Ulyanovsk              1-0  Metallurg Kuibyshev 
 ŽALGIRIS Vilnius             2-0  Moldova Kishinev 
 [Mar 30] 
 KRIVBASS Krivoi Rog          1-0  Metallist Kharkov 
   [S.Sokolov] 
 Lokomotiv Vinnitsa           0-2  METALLURG Zaporozhye 
   [Yeryomenko 16, Soroka 82] 
 SKA Odessa                   2-0  Zvezda Kirovograd 
   [V.Lideka 22, V.Tomashevskiy 37] 
 SUDOSTROITEL Nikolayev       1-0  Stroitel Poltava 
   [Kurinny 86] 
 TAVRIA Simferopol            3-1  Bukovina Chernovtsy 
   [Kvanin 1, 13 pen, Klimov ? – Semyonov ?] 
 [Apr 1] 
 DNEPR Dnepropetrovsk         1-0  Avangard Ternopol 
   [Biba 26]

First round replays
 [Mar 24] 
 Polad Sumgait                3-3  Vostok Ust-Kamenogorsk 
 SKA Chita                    2-1  Selenga Ulan-Ude             [aet] 
 Stroitel Ufa                 0-3  ZVEZDA Perm 
 [Mar 25] 
 Polad Sumgait                1-1  VOSTOK Ust-Kamenogorsk       [by draw]

Second round
 [Mar 27] 
 ALGA Frunze                  2-0  Energetik Dushanbe 
 DAUGAVA Riga                 w/o  Dinamo Kirovabad 
 IRTYSH Omsk                  2-0  Temp Barnaul 
 LOKOMOTIV Kaluga             3-2  Terek Grozny                 [aet] 
 LUCH Vladivostok             1-0  SKA Chita 
 Pamir Leninabad              0-1  POLITOTDEL Tashkent Region 
 RASSVET Krasnoyarsk          2-0  TomLes Tomsk 
 RUBIN Kazan                  2-1  Zvezda Perm 
 SHAKHTYOR Karaganda          1-0  Shirak Leninakan 
 SHINNIK Yaroslavl            2-1  Dinamo Leningrad 
   [V.Novikov, G.Nagorny - ?] 
 SOKOL Saratov                2-1  Textilshchik Ivanovo 
 SPARTAK Belgorod             3-0  Dinamo Stavropol 
 SPARTAK Yoshkar-Ola          2-1  Volga Ulyanovsk              [aet] 
 TORPEDO Taganrog             4-1  Volga Kalinin 
 TRUD Voronezh                2-0  Spartak Orjonikidze 
 ŽALGIRIS Vilnius             1-0  Vostok Ust-Kamenogorsk 
 [Mar 28] 
 Stroitel Ashkhabad           0-1  SPARTAK Brest 
   [V.Statsyuk] 
 [Apr 4] 
 Azovets Zhdanov              0-0  Karpaty Lviv 
 Dnepr Dnepropetrovsk         0-1  AVTOMOBILIST Zhitomir 
   [V.Popov] 
 KRIVBASS Krivoi Rog          2-0  Khimik Severodonetsk 
 SKA Odessa                   1-0  Dinamo Khmelnitskiy 
   [V.Tomashevskiy 40] 
 [Apr 5] 
 METALLURG Zaporozhye         3-1  Tavria Simferopol 
   [Y.Satayev 70, Kutin 75, Kochegarov 79 – Klimov 20] 
 SKA Kiev                     0-1  SUDOSTROITEL Nikolayev 
   [Poluyanov 32] 
 [Apr 24] 
 ROSTSELMASH Rostov-na-Donu   1-0  Mashuk Pyatigorsk 
   [G.Kachura]

Second round replays
 [Apr 5] 
 Azovets Zhdanov            1-2  KARPATY Lviv 
   [? – Vladimir Danilyuk, Yanosh Gabovda]

Third round
 [Apr 1] 
 LUCH Vladivostok             w/o  Rassvet Krasnoyarsk 
 RUBIN Kazan                  3-0  Irtysh Omsk 
 SHAKHTYOR Karaganda          1-0  Politotdel Tashkent Region 
 SHINNIK Yaroslavl            1-0  Spartak Belgorod 
   [V.Sanin] 
 Spartak Yoshkar-Ola          0-0  Sokol Saratov 
 TORPEDO Taganrog             2-1  Lokomotiv Kaluga 
 Žalgiris Vilnius             0-0  Daugava Riga 
 [Apr 19] 
 Alga Frunze                  2-2  Spartak Brest 
   [? – V.Stuk, V.Kandulinskiy] 
 [Apr 20] 
 AVTOMOBILIST Zhitomir        2-0  Krivbass Krivoi Rog 
 KARPATY Lviv                 1-0  SKA Odessa 
   [Gennadiy Likhachov 86 pen] 
 SUDOSTROITEL Nikolayev       2-1  Metallurg Zaporozhye         [aet] 
   [Poluyanov 74, Y.Derevyago 109 – Satayev] 
 [May 5] 
 TRUD Voronezh                1-0  RostSelMash Rostov-na-Donu

Third round replays
 [Apr 2] 
 Spartak Yoshkar-Ola          2-3  SOKOL Saratov                [aet] 
   [? – Shpitalny-2, Pashovkin] 
 ŽALGIRIS Vilnius             2-0  Daugava Riga 
 [Apr 20] 
 Alga Frunze                  0-1  SPARTAK Brest 
   [V.Kuchinskiy]

Fourth round
 [May 21] 
 AVTOMOBILIST Zhitomir        1-0  Shakhtyor Donetsk 
   [A.Gorelov 83] 
 DINAMO Moskva                2-0  Neftchi Baku 
   [Yuriy Syomin 4, Valeriy Gajiyev 69] 
 SHAKHTYOR Karaganda          2-1  Dinamo Minsk 
   [A.Chentsov 37, V.Pavlov 52 – G.Sharonov 72] 
 TORPEDO Taganrog             2-0  Zarya Lugansk 
   [Bulgakov 13, Pankratov 85] 
 [May 22] 
 CHERNOMORETS Odessa          3-2  Dinamo Tbilisi 
   [Viktor Prokopenko 46, 56, Vasiliy Moskalenko 50 – Kakhi Asatiani 20, Slava Metreveli 90] 
 SUDOSTROITEL Nikolayev       2-1  Torpedo Kutaisi              [aet] 
   [Kimalov 44, Poluyanov 94 – Sanaia 18] 
 KARPATY Lviv                 2-1  Ararat Yerevan               [aet] 
   [Gennadiy Likhachov 104 pen, Igor Kulchitskiy 114 – Suren Martirosyan 94] 
 Lokomotiv Moskva             2-3  DINAMO Kiev 
   [Boris Kokh 71, Yuriy Karnakhin 90 – Vladimir Muntyan 15, Vitaliy Khmelnitskiy 58, Anatoliy Puzach 60] 
 LUCH Vladivostok             1-0  UralMash Sverdlovsk 
   [V.Starukhin] 
 Pahtakor Tashkent            0-3  TORPEDO Moskva 
   [Mikhail Gershkovich-2, Gennadiy Shalimov] 
 RUBIN Kazan                  3-2  Krylya Sovetov Kuibyshev 
   [Penzin, Vorobyov, V.Kolotov – Yuriy Starkov, ?] 
 Shinnik Yaroslavl            1-3  SKA Rostov-na-Donu 
   [Frolov – Vasiliy Golovko-2, Vladimir Proskurin] 
 SOKOL Saratov                5-0  Kayrat Alma-Ata 
   [Y.Smirnov-3, Lipatov, Filipenko] 
 Spartak Brest                1-2  ZENIT Leningrad 
   [V.Kandulinskiy 70 - Viktor Votolovskiy 60, Gennadiy Unanov 64] 
 Trud Voronezh                0-0  Spartak Moskva 
 Žalgiris Vilnius             0-1  CSKA Moskva 
   [Vladimir Polikarpov 63 pen]

Fourth round replay
 [May 23] 
 TRUD Voronezh                1-0  Spartak Moskva 
   [V.Reingold 77]

Fifth round
 [Jun 12] 
 SKA Rostov-na-Donu      3-0  Torpedo Taganrog 
   [Vladimir Proskurin 30, 47, Anatoliy Zinchenko 72] 
 [Jun 16] 
 Zenit Leningrad         0-1  TORPEDO Moskva 
   [Mikhail Gershkovich 83] 
 [Jun 27] 
 DINAMO Kiev             5-1  Shakhtyor Karaganda 
   [Viktor Serebryanikov 24, Vladimir Muntyan 48, Anatoliy Puzach 51, Anatoliy Bogovik 60, 88 – Y.Pavlov 29] 
 DINAMO Moskva           2-1  Luch Vladivostok 
   [Vladimir Larin 21, Smirnov 29 – Osenniy 67] 
 [Jun 28] 
 KARPATY Lviv            2-0  Chernomorets Odessa 
   [Yanosh Gabovda 49, Gennadiy Likhachov 55] 
 Rubin Kazan             0-2  SUDOSTROITEL Nikolayev        [aet] 
   [Kimalov 104, Poluyanov 113] 
 [Jun 29] 
 CSKA Moskva             0-0  Avtomobilist Zhitomir 
 Sokol Saratov           1-2  TRUD Voronezh 
   [Y.Smirnov ? – Golodubov 3, Manuilov 42]

Fifth round replay
 [Jun 30] 
 CSKA Moskva             1-0  Avtomobilist Zhitomir 
   [Berador Abduraimov 47]

Quarterfinals
 [Jul 14] 
 Trud Voronezh           0-1  KARPATY Lviv 
   [Gennadiy Likhachov 35 pen] 
 [Jul 15] 
 Torpedo Moskva          1-2  SUDOSTROITEL Nikolayev 
   [Mikhail Gershkovich 61 – Kimalov 5, Averyanov 35] 
 [Jul 17] 
 CSKA Moskva             1-0  Dinamo Kiev                   [aet] 
   [Berador Abduraimov 104] 
 SKA Rostov-na-Donu      1-0  Dinamo Moskva 
   [Anatoliy Zinchenko 76]

Semifinals
 [Jul 19] 
 KARPATY Lviv            2-0  Sudostroitel Nikolayev 
   [Gennadiy Likhachov 36, Yanosh Gabovda 43] 
 [Jul 29] 
 SKA Rostov-na-Donu      1-0  CSKA Moskva 
   [Vladimir Proskurin 45]

Final

External links
 Complete calendar. helmsoccer.narod.ru
 1969 Soviet Cup. Footballfacts.ru
 1969 Soviet football season. RSSSF

Soviet Cup seasons
Cup
Soviet Cup
Soviet Cup